The men's decathlon event at the 2000 World Junior Championships in Athletics was held in Santiago, Chile, at Estadio Nacional Julio Martínez Prádanos on 18 and 19 October.  Senior implements (106.7 cm (3'6) hurdles, 7257g shot, 2 kg discus) were used.

Medalists

Results

Final
18/19 October

Participation
According to an unofficial count, 20 athletes from 14 countries participated in the event.

References

Decathlon
Combined events at the World Athletics U20 Championships